Climbing, or alpine, clubs form to promote and preserve the climbing way of life, including rock climbing, ice climbing, alpinism & ski mountaineering. 

Clubs frequently act as advocates to protect climbing areas, advocate for climbers around the world, preserve climbing’s history and chronicle climbing achievement.

Climbing clubs usually schedule climbing meets & events allowing members an opportunity to meet like-minded individuals, learn new skills and partake in lead climbing which by definition requires two or more individuals.

Organization

Climbing clubs are often affiliated to a national governing or representative body for purposes of public liability insurance.

In the UK this is most often the British Mountaineering Council. In Ireland this is most often Mountaineering Ireland.

Club facilities

Clubs may typically provide:

 Scheduled meets & training
 Mountain huts & reciprocal arrangements with other hut owners
 Books, newsletters & other publications
 Social events
 Limited public/civil liability insurance
 Rescue insurance
 Discount schemes with climbing shops
 Libraries & photo collections
 Climbing grants
 Conservation, stewardship & advocacy

Notable climbing clubs
Climbers' Club
California Mountaineering Group
American Alpine Club
British Alpine Club
Swiss Alpine Club (Club Alpin Suisse)
French Climbing Club (Club Alpin Francais)
German Alpine Club
(Netherlands climbing and mountaineering society) Nederlandse Klim en Bergsport Vereniging (NKBV)

References

Climbing organizations
Sports clubs